Uigeumbu (in Hangul:의금부, in Hanja: 義禁府) refers to the judiciary organ during Goryeo and Joseon dynasty in Korea. Another names are Geum-o or Wangbu (The ministry of the King). The structure was in charge of questioning the case of treason or interrogating felons. Uigeumbu takes the equivalent position of today's Supreme Court.

History 
Uigeumbu roots from Soonmaso established during the reign of Chungnyeol of Goryeo. During Goryeo, the organ took largely broad responsibility of legal charges. However, early structure of Joseon followed former organ to make dominance of judicial power, which was resulted to take over the work of judicial police only.

Working with Saheonbu, the organ dealt with the lese majesty or legal execution. Generally, the responsibility covers the crimes of bureaucrats, foreigners or treason or the incidents seriously against the Confucianism. It also worked as the special court in emergency case.

The system of the organ was changed several times depending on the code in the current time. In 1414, the institution came to possess full independence. Basically, 4 subjects held the concurrent position. According to official code of Gyeongguk daejeon, about 200 officials coped with the judicial matters.

In 1894,Gojong of the Korean Empire converted the name to Uigeum-sa and then further started to hand down the decisions, only the case happened in Hanyang, current Seoul. Following Gabo reform, the office was named the High Court (고등재판소) and then the Pyeongriwon (평리원; 平理院) in 1899.

See also 
Joseon dynasty
Seungjeongwon

References

Politics of Korea
Joseon dynasty